Ceremony for the 27th Hong Kong Film Awards was held on 14 April 2008 in the Hong Kong Cultural Centre and hosted by Carol Cheng,  Sandra Ng and Sammi Cheng. Winners in nineteen categories were unveiled, with film The Warlords being the year's biggest winner.

The nominees were announced on 2 February 2008. Over a hundred nominees contested for seventeen categories of awards. The front runners were Protégé and The Warlords, with thirteen and twelve nominations respectively.

Awards
Below is a complete list of winners and nominees for the 27th Hong Kong Film Awards, which includes nineteen winners and over a hundred nominees in nineteen categories. Besides the regular categories, two special awards were given out this year, namely the Lifetime Achievement Award (to Raymond Chow) and the Professional Spirit Award (to late Lydia Shum). The year's biggest winner turned out to be The Warlords, which won eight total awards including three major awards in Best Film, Best Director, and Best Actor.

Winners are listed first, highlighted in boldface, and indicated with a double dagger.

References

External links
 Official website of the Hong Kong Film Awards
 List of awards

2008
2007 film awards
2008 in Hong Kong
Hong